Radu Bădica (? – 19 January 1524) was the son of Radu IV the Great and Prince of Wallachia from November 1523 until January 1524.

|-

Romanian royalty
Year of birth missing
Burials at Dealu Monastery, Viforâta (Dâmboviţa County)
1524 deaths
16th-century rulers in Europe